The year 1800 in archaeology involved some significant events.

Explorations

Excavations
 Bretby Castle, Derbyshire, England, a 16th-century fortified manor, is partially excavated.

Finds

Publications

Births
 August 13 - Ippolito Rosellini, Tuscan Egyptologist (d. 1843) 
 October 8 - Jules Desnoyers, French geologist and archaeologist (d. 1887)
 December 24 - Ferdinand Keller, Swiss archaeologist (d. 1881)
 Charles Masson, born James Lewis, British explorer of Buddhist sites (d. 1853)

Deaths
 June 28 - Théophile Corret de la Tour d'Auvergne, French antiquary (b. 1743)

References

Archaeology
Archaeology by year
Archaeology
Archaeology